The 2007–08 Rochdale A.F.C. season was the club's 87th season in the Football League, and the 34th consecutive season in the bottom division of the League. Rochdale finished the season in 5th place in League Two, but missed out on promotion to League One after losing in the play-off final against Stockport County.

League table

Statistics

																												
																												

|}

Competitions

Pre-season Friendlies

League Two

League Two play-offs

FA Cup

League Cup

League Trophy

References

Rochdale A.F.C. seasons
Rochdale